South Street station may refer to:

 South Street station (MBTA), Boston
 South Street station (LIRR), Queens, New York City
 South Street station (Pennsylvania Railroad), Newark, New Jersey
 South Street Station, historic power generation station in Providence, Rhode Island